Octavio Cuartero Cifuentes (February 14, 1855 - February 21, 1913) was a Spanish writer, judge and politician.

References 

1855 births
1913 deaths
20th-century Spanish judges
Spanish politicians
People from the Province of Albacete
Spanish journalists
19th-century Spanish judges